Hindley is a town in the Metropolitan Borough of Wigan, Greater Manchester, England.  It contains eleven listed buildings that are recorded in the National Heritage List for England.  All the listed buildings are designated at Grade II, the lowest of the three grades, which is applied to "buildings of national importance and special interest". The traditional industry in the town was nail making, and in the 19th century mining and textiles arrived in the area.  There are no listed buildings associated with any of these industries.  The listed buildings consist of houses, farmhouses and farm buildings, churches, a public house, and a library and museum.
 

Buildings

References

Citations

Sources

Lists of listed buildings in Greater Manchester